Carpiscula is a genus of sea snails, marine gastropod mollusks in the subfamily Eocypraeinae Schilder, 1924 of the family Ovulidae.

Species
Species within the genus Carpiscula include:
Carpiscula bullata (Sowerby in A. Adams & Reeve, 1848)
Carpiscula galearis Cate, 1973
Carpiscula procera Fehse, 2009
Carpiscula virginiae Lorenz & Fehse, 2009

References

 Lorenz, F. & Fehse, D., 2009 The living Ovulidae. A manual of the families of allied cowries: Ovulidae, Pediculariidae and Eocypraeidae, p. 651 pp

External links
 Cate C.N. (1973). A systematic revision of the recent cypraeid family Ovulidae. The Veliger. 15 (supplement): 1-117

Ovulidae